The Hot Angel is a 1958 American drama film directed by Joe Parker and written by Stanley Kallis. The film stars Jackie Loughery, Ed Kemmer, Mason Alan Dinehart, Emory Parnell, Lyle Talbot and Boyd Santell. It was released in December 1958 by Paramount Pictures.

Plot
Mandy Wilson runs a small air strip near the Grand Canyon. She and brother Joe are glad to see pilot Chuck Lawson, who hasn't been here in five years. Their brother Tom heroically saved Chuck's life during the Korean War.

Joe has fallen in with a motorcycle gang, so Chuck is asked by Mandy to help straighten him out. Chuck is hired by uranium miner Van Richards to maintain surveillance from the air and find out who's been stealing valuable mineral deposits. He meets the bikers in Joe's gang, particularly the leaders, Judd and Mick Pfeiffer, and demonstrates his own skill on a bike while also giving flying lessons to Joe.

When the thieves realize Chuck's on to them, his plane is rigged to crash. Chuck manages to land it in the Grand Canyon, but is in such a precarious place that he warns Joe not to attempt a rescue. Joe gets to him safely anyway, saving the day, and it's clear that Chuck and Mandy are now in love.

Cast 
Jackie Loughery as Mandy Wilson
Ed Kemmer as Chuck Lawson
Mason Alan Dinehart as Joe Wilson
Emory Parnell as Judd Pfeifer
Lyle Talbot as Van Richards
Boyd Santell as Mick Pfeiffer
Heather Ames as Lynn Conners
Steffi Sidney as Myrna
John Nolan as Ray
Richard Stauffer as Monk
Kathi Thornton as Liz
Harold Mallet as Pilot

References

External links 
 

1958 films
Paramount Pictures films
American drama films
1958 drama films
Films scored by Richard Markowitz
1950s English-language films
1950s American films